The William H. Trusty House is a historic home in the Phoebus section of Hampton, Virginia. It was built in 1897, and is a -story, wood-frame dwelling in the late Victorian style. It features a two-story, spindle-and-bracket porch, with a tent roof and capped by a finial.  It was built by William H. Trusty, a successful black businessman and civic leader. Trusty owned a bar, five houses, and two Main Street Business properties. He was the son of freed parents from Prince George County, Virginia.

It was listed on the National Register of Historic Places in 1979.

References

 Virginia African Heritage Program – William H. Trusty House 

African-American history of Virginia
Houses in Hampton, Virginia
Queen Anne architecture in Virginia
Houses on the National Register of Historic Places in Virginia
Houses completed in 1897
National Register of Historic Places in Hampton, Virginia